Auwe-Daonda is a Papuan language of Sandaun Province, Papua New Guinea. Auwe is spoken in Simog (Smock) and Watape villages of Smock ward, Walsa Rural LLG. Daonda is spoken near Imonda in Daondai ward, Walsa Rural LLG, Sandaun Province.

References

Border languages (New Guinea)
Languages of Sandaun Province